Libby, Montana is a 2004 documentary film about the biggest case of community-wide exposure to a toxic substance in U.S. history. The film details the story of the iconic mountainside town of Libby, Montana and the hundreds of residents who have been exposed to asbestos, raising questions of the role of corporate power in American politics.

Libby, Montana was directed, produced, and edited by Drury Gunn Carr and Doug Hawes-Davis and was aired as part of PBS's Point of View series in 2007.

See also
Alice - A Fight For Life, a 1982 British television documentary about asbestos exposure.

References

External links 
 P.O.V. Libby, Montana - PBS's site dedicated to the film
 

2004 films
POV (TV series) films
Documentary films about environmental issues
Asbestos
Documentary films about mining
2004 documentary films
Films shot in Montana
Lincoln County, Montana
Documentary films about Montana
2000s English-language films
2000s American films